Patchouli (Pogostemon cablin) is a species of flowering plant in the family Lamiaceae, commonly called the mint or deadnettle family. The plant grows as a bushy perennial herb, with erect stems reaching up to 75 centimetres (2.5 ft) in height and bearing small, pale pink-white flowers. 

It is native to the island region of Southeast Asia, including Sri Lanka, Indonesia, the Malay Peninsula, New Guinea and the Philippines. It is also found in many parts of North East India. Noted for its fragrant essential oil, it has many commercial uses and is now extensively cultivated in tropical climates around the world, especially in Asia, Madagascar, South America and the Caribbean. Indonesia currently produces over 90% of the global volume of patchouli oil (~1,600 metric tons).

Etymology
The word derives from the Tamil patchai or paccuḷi, meaning "green", and ellai, meaning "leaf".

Cultivation
Patchouli grows well in warm to tropical climates. It thrives in hot, humid weather but not extended periods of direct sunlight. If the plant withers due to lack of water, it tends to recover quickly after rain or watering. Although rare, the seed-producing flowers are very fragrant and blossom in late autumn. The tiny seeds may be harvested for planting, but they are very delicate and easily crushed. Cuttings and grafts from the mother plant and subsequent rooting in loamy soil are the most common methods for propagation.

Essential oil

Extraction
Extraction of patchouli's essential oil is by steam distillation of the dried leaves and twigs, requiring rupture of its cell walls by steam scalding, light fermentation, or drying. The main chemical component of patchouli oil is patchoulol, a sesquiterpene alcohol.

Leaves and twigs may be harvested several times a year.  Some sources say the highest quality oil is produced from fresh, share dried biomass distilled close to where they are harvested; others say that boiling the dried leaves and fermenting them for a period of time is best.

Components
 Germacrene-B
 Patchoulol
 Norpatchoulenol

Uses
The heavy, strong, woody, and earthy scent of patchouli has been used for centuries in perfumes, and more recently in incense, insect repellents, chewing tobacco, and many alternative medicines.

Pogostemon cablin, P. heyneanus and P. plectranthoides are all cultivated for their essential oil, known as patchouli oil. Although there are some sub-varieties, the most common commercial varieties are native to the islands of Sumatra and Sulawesi in Indonesia.

Perfume
Patchouli is used widely in modern perfumery by individuals who create their own scents,  as well as in modern scented personal products, such as Bay Rum, and industrial products, too, such as paper towels, laundry detergents, and air fresheners. Two important components of its essential oil are patchoulol and norpatchoulenol.

Insect repellent
One study suggests that patchouli oil may serve as an all-purpose insect repellent. More specifically, the patchouli plant is claimed to be a potent repellent against the Formosan subterranean termite.

Incense
Patchouli is an important ingredient in East Asian incense. Both patchouli oil and incense underwent a surge in popularity in the 1960s and 1970s in the US and Europe, mainly as a result of the hippie movement of those decades.

Culinary
Patchouli leaves have also been used to make a herbal tea. In some cultures, the leaves are eaten as a vegetable or used as a seasoning. There are also several herbal medicines, both in Indonesia and in China (TCM), that include dry, ground patchouli leaves as one of the key ingredients.

Toys
In 1985, American toy manufacturer Mattel used patchouli oil in the plastic used to produce the action figure Stinkor in the Masters of the Universe line of toys.

In popular culture
Gene Tierney's character Ellen in the movie Leave Her to Heaven (1945) was given the nickname Patchouli by her husband in the film.

The song "Year of the Cat" (1976) by Al Stewart contains the line, "She comes in incense and patchouli."

Patchouli Knowledge is a recurring character in the bullet-hell game series Touhou Project.

Notes

References

Pogostemon
Incense material
Perfume ingredients
Insect repellents
Plants used in traditional Chinese medicine
Essential oils
Hippie movement
Plants described in 1848